Caleb Slye Blanchard (May 8, 1818November 10, 1893) was an American physician and politician.  He served one term in the Wisconsin State Assembly, representing northeast Walworth County, and served as a surgeon for the Union Army during the American Civil War.

Biography
Blanchard was born on May 8, 1818, in Victory, Cayuga County, New York.  He attended the Victor Academy there, then, at age 19, apprenticed as a physician with his older brother Orin W. Blanchard.  After three years, he entered the Pittsfield Medical College, in Pittsfield, Massachusetts, to finish his education.

In 1843, he moved to Racine, in the Wisconsin Territory, and established his own medical practice.  After a bout of poor health, he left Racine in December 1848 and moved to East Troy, in neighboring Walworth County, Wisconsin.  He continued to practice here until his service in the American Civil War.

In 1862, he volunteered for service in with the 22nd Wisconsin Infantry Regiment, which was composed of mostly companies from Racine and Walworth counties.  He was enrolled as 1st assistant surgeon and accompanied the regiment for a year.  He resigned in July 1863 due to disability.

After the war, he resumed his work in East Troy for another 30 years.  Around 1890 he moved west to Mazomanie, Wisconsin, in Dane County, where he died in 1893.

Political career
Blanchard was elected to the Wisconsin State Assembly in 1879 on the Republican ticket.  He was an unsuccessful candidate for re-election in 1880—he was defeated by the independent republican candidacy of Lindsey J. Smith.  Additionally, he was a member of the East Troy Board of Supervisors and justice of the peace.

Personal life and family
Blanchard's father, Willard Blanchard, served as a captain in the New York Militia during the War of 1812.  Caleb Blanchard was one of seven children born to Willard Blanchard and his wife Sallie ( Platt).  Two of his brothers also became medical doctors.  His brother Orin also moved to the Wisconsin Territory in 1843—he also served as chief surgeon for the 40th Wisconsin Infantry Regiment in the war.  Orin's son Charles served as a private in the 22nd Wisconsin Infantry with Caleb Blanchard, and served as hospital steward in the 40th Wisconsin Infantry with his father.

On June 14, 1852, Caleb Blanchard married Susan G. Ames.  She died on January 19, 1860. Blanchard later married Jennette D. Park on July 27, 1861.  Jennette was a school teacher and principal in East Troy.  Caleb and Jennette had four children.  Two of their sons, Charles and Albert, also went on to become medical doctors.

Electoral history

| colspan="6" style="text-align:center;background-color: #e9e9e9;"| General Election, November 4, 1879

| colspan="6" style="text-align:center;background-color: #e9e9e9;"| General Election, November 2, 1880

References

People from Cayuga County, New York
People from East Troy, Wisconsin
Wisconsin city council members
Republican Party members of the Wisconsin State Assembly
American justices of the peace
People of Wisconsin in the American Civil War
Union Army colonels
Union Army soldiers
American Congregationalists
1818 births
1893 deaths
19th-century American politicians
19th-century American judges